Heinz Drossel  (21 September 1916 – 28 April 2008) was a German lieutenant in World War II who was named one of the Righteous Among the Nations, shared with his parents, for helping Jews escape persecution. He was the son of Paul and Elfriede Drossel, both anti-Nazis, and shared their political philosophy. Drafted in November 1939, Drossel served in the Battle of France before serving on the Eastern Front for the rest of the war.

His philanthropic actions began in 1941, when he saved Soviet prisoners from being executed and secretly released them to return to Soviet lines. While on leave in Berlin in 1942, he started covertly assisting Jews when he found a Jewish woman, Marianne Hirschfeld, about to leap from a bridge. Risking court-martial and execution, he sheltered her in his apartment before giving her money to find a safer place to stay.  They married after the war. 

In 1945 Drossel helped Ernst Fontheim, his wife Margot, and her parents find shelter. He was sent back to the Eastern Front that Spring. On 4 May, just four days before the war would end, he was ordered by the Waffen-SS to lead his troops in a suicidal attack on Soviet positions. Drossel refused, and when threatened with execution he was saved with the capitulation of the Wehrmacht. He was briefly imprisoned by the Soviets and released before the end of the year.

In his postwar life, Drossel served as a judge. He married Marianne Hirschfeld, the first Jew whom he had saved. He was named as one of the Righteous Among the Nations in 2000. After receiving the award he often gave inspirational speeches to German children at schools. He died in 2008 in Simonswald.

External links
2004, Heinz Drossel – Wallenberg Legacy, University of Michigan
Heinz Drossel – his activity to save Jews' lives during the Holocaust, at Yad Vashem website

1916 births
2008 deaths
20th-century German judges
German Army officers of World War II
German Righteous Among the Nations
Recipients of the Cross of the Order of Merit of the Federal Republic of Germany
German prisoners of war in World War II held by the Soviet Union